General elections were held in the Faroe Islands on 7 November 1974. The Social Democratic Party emerged as the largest party in the Løgting, winning 7 of the 26 seats.

Results

References

Faroe Islands
1974 in the Faroe Islands
Elections in the Faroe Islands
November 1974 events in Europe
Election and referendum articles with incomplete results